E&S may refer to:
Evans & Sutherland, American computer firm
Express & Star, a regional evening newspaper in Britain
E&S Music, a record company founded by Simon Cowell